He Got Game is a soundtrack and sixth studio album by American hip hop group Public Enemy, released on April 28, 1998 under Def Jam Recordings. It was released as the soundtrack to Spike Lee's 1998 film of the same name and was the group's last album for Def Jam until 2020's What You Gonna Do When the Grid Goes Down. He Got Game was produced by members of the Bomb Squad, along with producers Abnes Dubose, Danny Saber, D. R. Period, and Jack Dangers.

The album sold poorly upon its release and peaked at number 26 on the Billboard 200. Its single, the title track, charted at number 16 in the United Kingdom, where the album reached number 50. He Got Game was well received by music critics, who praised its melodic sound and Chuck D's lyrics.

Background 
He Got Game served as the soundtrack to Spike Lee's 1998 basketball drama of the same name. A film score of the same name, featuring music composed by Aaron Copland, was also released on April 21.

After a four-year hiatus by the group, Professor Griff and The Bomb Squad reunited with Public Enemy for the album, which features political, sports-derived imagery by Chuck D. According to critic Armond White, He Got Game uses basketball as a metaphor for "the essence of black male aspiration. Disproving the film's suggestion of b-ball as an easy passport out of the ghetto, [Public Enemy] challenge trite assumptions about black luck and skill". The album's production features backup female vocals, church-like chorales, austere beats, strings, and funk samples. The title track overtly interpolates Buffalo Springfield's 1966 song "For What It's Worth," and its vocalist Stephen Stills makes an appearance on the song. It was released as He Got Games only single in May 1998.

Commercial performance 
He Got Game debuted at number 26 on the US Billboard 200 chart on May 11, 1998, and sold 46,282 copies in its first week. Despite hip hop music's increased commercial viability at the time, the album had fallen out of the top 100 by July. In an article for the Los Angeles Times, Robert Hilburn opined that its "relatively lackluster showing" with consumers was due to Public Enemy's image and lyrical content rather than the album's quality:

In the United Kingdom, He Got Game peaked at number 50 on the UK Albums Chart, while the title track reached number 16 on the singles chart; it did not chart on the US Hot 100.

Critical reception 

He Got Game was well received by music critics. In his review for Rolling Stone magazine, Scott Poulson-Bryant called the album "dense and eclectic, brilliant at moments but sometimes confusing," and found Chuck D to be "inspired again, coming up with blues poetry for the hoops age." Keith Phipps of The A.V. Club felt that, despite occasionally uninformed "lyrical snippets", most of the album has "the sense of urgency and menace that characterized PE's best work ... and the reformed Bomb Squad's sound has expanded in some interesting directions."

In his review for the Chicago Sun-Times, Jim DeRogatis called He Got Game "as hard-hitting as anything PE has done" and said that the group "nods to current tastes with more melodic hooks and less white noise than it has offered in the past." Music critic Robert Christgau credited Chuck D for realizing "the soundtrack concept" and viewed that, although only the Danny Saber and Jack Dangers-produced "Go Cat Go" resembles "the stressful speed of classic PE", the hooks are appropriated "subtly" and "brilliantly". Christgau named it the eighth best album of the year in his list for The Village Voices Pazz & Jop critics' poll.

Track listing

Personnel
Credits for He Got Game adapted from Allmusic.

 4Kast – backing vocals
 Leonard Bernstein – conductor
 Corey Brewer – associate producer
 Alice Butts – design
 Chris Champion – engineer
 Aaron Copland – conductor
 Jack Dangers – scratching, programming, producer, emax
 Dolo – engineer
 Abnes Dubose – producer
 (Ex) Cat Heads – executive producer
 Paul Falcone – engineer
 Gary G-Wiz – producer
 Reeves Gabrels – guitar
 Ben Garrison – engineer
 Gerard Gashkin – photography
 Rawle Gittens – engineer
 Rasheed Goodlowe – engineer
 Bill Green – executive in charge of music
 Charles Harbutt – engineer
 Chris Haynes – engineer
 David Lee – photography
 Spike Lee – liner notes, executive producer
 Ken Lewis – mixing

 Paul Logus – guitar, engineer, mixing
 London Symphony Orchestra – performer
 Ricco Lumpkins – engineer
 Jonathan Mannion – photography
 Kathy Nelson – executive producer, executive in charge of music
 New York Philharmonic – performer
 Joseph M. Palmaccio – mastering
 Gordon Parks – photography
 John Penn II – engineer
 David Phelps – guitar
 Philharmonia Orchestra – performer
 Tony Prendatt – engineer, mixing
 Mario Rodriguez – mixing
 Johnny Juice Rosado – scratching
 Danny Saber – programming, producer
 Eric "Vietnam" Sadler – production consultant
 Gary Schultz – producer
 Shabach Community Choir – choir, chorus
 Hank Shocklee – producer, executive producer
 Keith Shocklee – producer
 Alex Steyermark – music supervisor
 Ted Wohlsen – engineer
 Kerwin Young – bass, keyboards, producer

Charts

References

Bibliography

External links
 
 "Dancing With Mistah D" by Robert Christgau

1998 soundtrack albums
Public Enemy (band) albums
Hip hop soundtracks
Def Jam Recordings soundtracks
Drama film soundtracks